Sky Documentaries is a British pay television channel owned and operated by Sky, a division of Comcast, which launched on 27 May 2020. Sky Documentaries broadcasts imported programming from HBO alongside new original programming. The channel can also be watched via a live stream and box sets on Sky's streaming service, Now.



Programming
Sky Documentaries currently broadcast a variety of documentary series, both on the live TV feed and on demand:
After Truth: Disinformation and the Cost of Fake News
Allen v. Farrow
Agnelli
Bitter Pill: Primodos
Exterminate All the Brutes
Epstein’s Shadow: Ghislaine Maxwell
Framing Britney Spears
The Go-Go’s (also broadcast on Sky Arts in March 2021)
Hawking
Hillary
Janet Jackson
The Kingmaker
Lancaster
Look Away
McMillions
McQueen: The Lost Movie
The Plastic Nile
Robin Williams: Come Inside My Mind
Superswede (Ronnie Peterson)
Tiger Woods: The Comeback
Tina (Tina Turner)
 The Vow
 The Crime of the Century
Bruno v Tyson
The United Way
What's My Name: Muhammad Ali
Wu-Tang Clan: Of Mics and Men

Branding
The logo consists of the Sky logo coloured red followed by the word "documentaries" on a red background. The logo was originally black, but was later changed to red.

As of May 2020, the channel is sponsored by UK car manufacturer Jaguar.

International version
On 1 July 2021, Sky Documentaries was launched in Italy, alongside Sky Nature, Sky Investigation (the local version of Sky Witness) and Sky Serie (the local version of Sky Max).

On 9 September 2021, Sky Documentaries was launched in Germany, Austria and Switzerland.

See also
 List of television stations in the United Kingdom

References

Sky television channels
Television channels and stations established in 2020
English-language television stations in the United Kingdom
Television channels in the United Kingdom
2020 establishments in the United Kingdom
Documentary television channels